This was the first edition of the tournament.

Ulises Blanch won the title after defeating Roberto Cid Subervi 3–6, 6–4, 6–2 in the final.

Seeds
All seeds receive a bye into the second round.

Draw

Finals

Top half

Section 1

Section 2

Bottom half

Section 3

Section 4

References

External links
Main draw
Qualifying draw

2020 ATP Challenger Tour
2020,Singles